The Journal of Family Therapy is a quarterly peer-reviewed academic journal published by Wiley-Blackwell on behalf of the Association of Family Therapy and Systematic Practice.

Description 
The journal was established in 1979. It covers research related to family therapy, spanning subfields of psychology such as clinical psychology, therapy, counselling, and psychoanalysis.

According to the Journal Citation Reports, the journal has a 2017 impact factor of 1.066, ranking it 31st out of 46 journals in the category "Family Studies" and 99th out of 127 journals in the category "Psychology Clinical".

References

External links 
 

Wiley-Blackwell academic journals
English-language journals
Publications established in 1979
Quarterly journals
Family therapy journals
Psychotherapy journals